Neku is an Oceanic language of New Caledonia.

References

New Caledonian languages
Languages of New Caledonia
Severely endangered languages